MVJ College of Engineering (MVJCE) is a private autonomous engineering college located in Bangalore, Karnataka, India. MVJCE is affiliated to Visvesvaraya Technological University (VTU). It was established in 1982 by Venkatesha Education Society. It is situated on 15-acre campus in Whitefield, Bangalore.

History
MVJ College of Engineering was established in 1982 under Bangalore University affiliation as a flagship institution of the Venkatesha Education Society by Dr. M. V. Jayaraman with a vision to develop MVJCE as an Institute of academic excellence with high standards.

Board of Governors
Dr. B. N. Suresh, Chairman, Governing Council, Chancellor & Founder Director, Indian Institute of Space Science and Technology,  Thiruvananthapuram
Prof. B. N. Raghunandan, Professor and Dean (Retd.), Dept. of Aerospace Engineering, IISc., Bangalore
Prof. Chandrashekar, Visiting Chair Professor, National Institute of Advanced Studies, Bangalore
Dr. K. Ramachandra, Former Director – GTRE, Bangalore
Dr.Viraj Kumar, Visiting Professor, Divecha Centre for Climate Change, IISc., Bangalore
Mr. Vasantha Kumar Narayan, Cyclotis Software Solutions Pvt. Ltd., Bangalore
Mr. P. S. Krishnan, Distinguished Scientist (Retd.) & Ex. Director, Aeronautical Development Establishment, Bangalore.

Affiliation and accreditation
All the courses offered by  MVJ College of Engineering are  affiliated to Visvesvaraya Technological University (VTU), Belagavi & approved by All India Council for Technical Education (AICTE).

Aeronautical Engineering, Chemical Engineering, Computer Science and Engineering, Electronics and Communication, Electrical and Electronics, Mechanical Engineering and Information Science and Engineering programs offered by MVJ are accredited by National Board of Accreditation (NBA) and the College is accredited by the National Assessment and Accreditation Council (NAAC).

Like all higher education institutes in India, MVJCE is recognised by the University Grants Commission (UGC). MVJCE is also approved by the All India Council for Technical Education (AICTE) and some courses are accredited by the National Board of Accreditation (NBA). It is also accredited by the National Assessment and Accreditation Council (NAAC) with a B++ Grade.

Departments and courses
MVJ College of Engineering offers 11 undergraduate programmes and 5 post graduate programmes across various branches of Engineering.

Undergraduate
The following four-year undergraduate programs are offered: Aeronautical Engineering, Aerospace Engineering, Chemical Engineering, Civil Engineering, Computer Science and Engineering, Electronics and Communication Engineering, Electrical and Electronics Engineering, Information Science Engineering, Data Science, Artificial Intelligence & Machine Learning and Mechanical Engineering.

Postgraduate
The following two-year postgraduate programs are offered: Aeronautical Engineering, Computer Science and Engineering, Structural Engineering, Transportation Engineering. Master’s in Business Administration with dual specialization in HR/Finance/Marketing is also offered by MVJCE.

Research Centres
Department of Computer Science & Engineering, Civil Engineering, Electronics and Communication Engineering, Electrical and Electronics Engineering, Mechanical Engineering and Chemistry are recognized as Research Centres by VTU to pursue Doctoral Programme.

Student activities
MVJCE hosts three annual festivals, a technical fest called VertechX,  a cultural fest called SWAYAM and Innovation Day.

Rankings
61 among top private engineering colleges in India, The Outlook Magazine, 2020
28 among top private engineering colleges in India, India Today, 2020
37 among top private engineering colleges in India, The Week, 2020

Notable alumni
 Vishnu Raj Menon, Mr India 2016 and Indian model

References

External links

 

Engineering colleges in Bangalore
Educational institutions established in 1982
1982 establishments in Karnataka
Affiliates of Visvesvaraya Technological University